On 26 April 2021 the Tatmadaw and the Karen National Liberation Army (the armed wing of the Karen National Union) clashed near the Myanmar–Thailand border. The fighting ended with the capture and scorching of a Tatmadaw military base by the Karen National Liberation Army. The Tatamdaw responded with airstrikes in Kayin State. As of late April, 2021,Al Jazeera described the clashes as "the fiercest fighting between the Tatmadaw and an ethnic armed group since the 1 February coup."

The clashes occurred in the backdrop of increasing violence and protests in Myanmar caused by the Tatmadaw's coup on 1 February 2021. Prior to the clashes, international organisations and analysts, such as the United Nations Special Envoy on Myanmar, warned that an escalation in violence could lead to a nationwide civil war. The clashes also broke a brief period of "relative calm" that followed the ASEAN Summit held two days earlier.

See also
2021 Myanmar coup d'état
2021 Myanmar protests
Timeline of the 2021 Myanmar protests

References 

2021 in Myanmar
April 2021 events in Asia
Conflicts in 2021
March 2021 events in Asia
Protests in Myanmar
Separatism in Myanmar
Internal conflict in Myanmar